Joseph Marion "Jay" Tanner (March 26, 1859 – August 19, 1927) was an American educator and a leader in the Church of Jesus Christ of Latter-day Saints (LDS Church). He has been described as "one of the most gifted teachers and writers in the [LDS] Church in the late nineteenth and early twentieth centuries".

Tanner was born in Payson, Utah Territory, in a Latter-day Saint family. He attended Brigham Young Academy in Provo, Utah before departing the United States as a missionary for the LDS Church. From 1884 to 1887, he preached Mormonism in Europe and the Middle East. Along with Jacob Spori, he was the first LDS Church missionary to preach in the Ottoman Empire—where they baptized Mischa Markow—and was the organizer of the first branch of the LDS Church in Palestine.

From 1887 to 1891, Tanner was the principal of Brigham Young College in Logan, Utah. In 1891, he became the leader of the first group of Latter-day Saints to enroll at Harvard University. Tanner studied law at Harvard Law School until 1894, when his ill health prompted him to return to Utah.

From 1896 to 1900, Tanner was president of Utah Agricultural College, which is today Utah State University.

In 1901, Tanner succeeded Karl G. Maeser and became the second Commissioner of Church Education for the LDS Church. At the same time, he became the second assistant to Lorenzo Snow in the general superintendency of the church's Deseret Sunday School Union. When Snow died and was succeeded by Joseph F. Smith, Tanner became Smith's second assistant in the church's Sunday School.

Tanner retired in 1906 and emigrated to Alberta, Canada, where he farmed in the Cardston area.

From 1906 to 1921 Tanner wrote extensively for the Improvement Era, an official periodical of the LDS Church. He wrote a number of books, including manuals for the church's Sunday School and a biography of John R. Murdock.

Tanner was a practitioner of plural marriage and had six wives. His second wife, Annie Clark Tanner, reported his abandoning her and their children.

Tanner died in Lethbridge, Alberta, and was buried in Salt Lake City, Utah.

See also
 O. C. Tanner

Notes

References
 Arnold K. Garr, Donald Q. Cannon & Richard O. Cowan (eds.) (2000). Encyclopedia of Latter-day Saint History (Salt Lake City, Utah: Deseret Book)
 Margery W. Ward (1980). A Life Divided: The Biography of Joseph Marion Tanner, 1859–1927 (Shepherdsville, Ken.: Publishers Press)

1859 births
1927 deaths
19th-century Mormon missionaries
American Latter Day Saint writers
American Mormon missionaries in Palestine (region)
American emigrants to Canada
American expatriates in the Ottoman Empire
American leaders of the Church of Jesus Christ of Latter-day Saints
Brigham Young College faculty
Canadian Latter Day Saint writers
Canadian Latter Day Saints
Canadian leaders of the Church of Jesus Christ of Latter-day Saints
Commissioners of Church Education (LDS Church)
Counselors in the General Presidency of the Sunday School (LDS Church)
Harvard Law School alumni
Latter Day Saints from Massachusetts
Latter Day Saints from Utah
Mormon missionaries in Europe
Mormon missionaries in the Ottoman Empire
People from Cardston County
People from Payson, Utah
Presidents of Utah State University
Tanner family
Utah State University faculty
Writers from Logan, Utah